Murder Void is an Italian metalcore band from Milan. It was formed in 2012 and has released two studio EPs (Smoke Your Last Breath and Life Is Yours) and four singles, including "Regret Nothing".

As part of the metalcore scene, Murder Void has opened for Kingdom of Giants, Ready, Set Fall!, Imminence, Beyond All Recognition, Burning Down Alaska, Dream on Dreamer and other bands from all over the world.

In 2015, Murder Void released the first song from the EP Life Is Yours, "Hope", which was made in a DIY ethic. Its lyrics talk about a straight edge lifestyle. With the EP Life Is Yours, the band took on an anti-racist position. In April 2016, the lead singer, Davide Aroldi, left the band and was replaced by Erick Vaghi.

Members
Current members
Erick Vaghi – vocals
Massimiliano Foti – guitar
Giacomo Bonfadini – guitar
Mirko La Verde – bass guitar
Michele Riva – drums

Past members
Davide Aroldi – vocals
Christian Cesare Magli – vocals
Theo Volpe – guitar and clean vocals

Touring members
Mattia Frassinetti – guitar

Timeline

Discography

EPs
 Smoke Your Last Breath (2012)
 Life Is Yours (2015)

Singles
 "Regret Nothing" (2013)
 "Hope" (2014)
 "Northstar" (2014)
 "Echoes" (2016)

References

External links
 

Italian metalcore musical groups
Musical groups established in 2012
Musical groups disestablished in 2017
Musical quintets
Musical groups from Milan
2012 establishments in Italy